Adamić, Adamič, or Adamic is a patronymic surname in South Slavic languages literally meaning "son of Adam". Notable people with the surname include:

Andrija Ljudevit Adamić
Bojan Adamič
Emil Adamič
Lada Adamic

Patronymic surnames
South Slavic-language surnames